Maxdata Software is a Portugal-based company that develops healthcare software. Maxdata is one of the developers of Clinidata software, which is used in Portuguese hospitals and laboratories, and responsibility terms management. 

Maxdata Software begun operating under the ISO/IEC 20000 international standard in 2011.

List of Clindata products 
 XXI - software for clinical pathology
 ANP - software for anatomic pathology
 BST - software for immunohematology
 NET - software for electronic prescription
 TRM - software for responsibility terms management
 VEP - software for epidemiologic surveillance

References

External links
 

Medical technology companies of Portugal
Software companies of Portugal
Portuguese brands